Valaste is a village in Toila Parish, Ida-Viru County in northeastern Estonia. Its German name was Wallast. The village is home to Estonia's highest waterfall, Valaste Waterfall.

Before the 2017 Administrative Reform, the village belonged to Kohtla Parish.

References

 

Villages in Ida-Viru County